The Andrew Kerr House is a historic home located near Newark, New Castle County, Delaware. It was built in 1805, and is a two-story, gable-roofed, stuccoed stone structure.  It has a two-story addition dated to the late-19th century.  It features a polygonal bay window on its principal elevation. The Kerr family were prominent members of Head of Christiana United Presbyterian Church.

It was listed on the National Register of Historic Places in 1983.

References

Houses on the National Register of Historic Places in Delaware
Houses completed in 1805
Houses in Newark, Delaware
1805 establishments in Delaware
National Register of Historic Places in New Castle County, Delaware